Kalev Sports Hall is a multi-purpose arena in Estonia. It was built in 1962 and holds up to 1,780 people (all-seater).

It generally hosts basketball games, but also trainings and minor-league competitions for volleyball, athletics, futsal, tennis and gymnastics.

It's located in Juhkentali, a subdistrict of Kesklinn (central town).

References

External links

Sports venues in Tallinn
1962 establishments in Estonia
Sports venues in Estonia
Indoor arenas in Estonia
Sports venues completed in 1962
Basketball venues in Estonia
Volleyball venues in Estonia
Badminton venues